This list of people from Brookfield, Connecticut includes current and past residents as well as others associated with Brookfield, Connecticut. The list is categorized by the area in which each person is best known, in alphabetical order within each category:

Actors, musicians, and others in entertainment
 Carlyle Blackwell, silent film actor, director and producer
 Frederick Bristol, voice teacher and singer
 Julia DeMato, contestant on American Idol
 Will Denton, actor on the NBC series Kidnapped
 Frank Enea, musician and composer
 C. B. Hawley, bass, voice teacher, organist and composer
 Brian Slawson, Grammy-nominated composer
 Ronnie Spector, rock and roll singer
 Kari Wuhrer (born 1967), actress and singer of Cherokee and German descent

Authors, writers, journalists, photojournalists
 Virgil Geddes, playwright, political activist, and founder of the Brookfield Players
 Joseph Hayes, novelist and playwright, author of The Desperate Hours

Government, military
 Martin Foncello, representative for Connecticut's 107th General Assembly District
 Stephen Harding, attorney and senator for Connecticut's 5th State Senate district
 Samuel E. Merwin, 44th Governor of Connecticut (1889–1893)
 Lou Rell, First Gentleman of Connecticut (married to M. Jodi Rell); aviator
 M. Jodi Rell, 87th Governor of Connecticut (in office 2004–2011, resident 1969–2016)

Business
Anna Mangin, inventor and women's rights campaigner
Shelly Palmer, advertising, marketing and technology consultant, and business adviser
Michael Walrath, venture capitalist, founder and CEO of Right Media
Scott Werndorfer, co-founder and developer of Cerulean Studios

Sports
Scott Lutrus, football player in the NFL
 Gene Sarazen, golfer; won the United States Open, British Open, PGA Championship, and the Masters; built Sunset Hill Golf Course in Brookfield

Artists
 Lester Beall, modern graphic design pioneer
 Bob Camp, cartoonist, comic book artist, director, and producer
 Elizabeth Peyton, painter who rose to popularity in the mid-1990s
 Bill Westenhofer, visual effects artist and winner of two Academy Awards

Others
 Joseph Collins, neurologist and co-founder of the Neurological Institute of New York

See also
 List of people from Connecticut
 List of people from Bridgeport, Connecticut
 List of people from Darien, Connecticut
 List of people from Greenwich, Connecticut
 List of people from Hartford, Connecticut
 List of people from New Canaan, Connecticut
 List of people from New Haven, Connecticut
 List of people from Norwalk, Connecticut
 List of people from Redding, Connecticut
 List of people from Ridgefield, Connecticut
 List of people from Stamford, Connecticut
 List of people from Westport, Connecticut

References

Brookfield Connecticut